Soledad Faedo (born 17 December 1987) is a team handball player from Uruguay. She has played on the Uruguay women's national handball team, and participated at the 2005 World Women's Handball Championship in Russia and the 2011 World Women's Handball Championship in Brazil.

References

1987 births
Living people
Uruguayan female handball players
Handball players at the 2011 Pan American Games
Handball players at the 2015 Pan American Games
Pan American Games bronze medalists for Uruguay
Pan American Games medalists in handball
Medalists at the 2015 Pan American Games
21st-century Uruguayan women